Pico da Neblina National Park is a national park in the state of Amazonas in the north of Brazil, bordering on Venezuela. It overlaps with several indigenous territories, which creates tensions over land use, as does the military presence due to the border location. The park includes lowlands around the Rio Negro, partly flooded, and mountains that include the highest peak in Brazil, after which the park is named. The wide variety of physical environments supports great biodiversity, including several endangered species.

Location

The Pico da Neblina National Park is divided between the municipalities of São Gabriel da Cachoeira (29.21%) and Santa Isabel do Rio Negro (70.79%) in the state of Amazonas.
The park may be accessed by boat along the Igarapé Itamirim or the Cauaburi and Sá rivers.
It may also be reached by small airplane from Manaus.

The park adjoins the  Serranía de la Neblina National Park in Venezuela, to the north.
To the south it is bounded by the Rio Negro.
The park and the Balaio Indigenous Territory surround the  Morro dos Seis Lagos Biological Reserve, created in 1990.
The park would be included in the proposed Northern Amazon Ecological Corridor.

History

The Pico da Neblina National Park was created on World Environment Day, 5 June 1979, by President General João Figueiredo.
It is classed as IUCN protected area category II (national park).
At the recommendation of the Federal Public Ministry the park was closed to the public from 2003 due to uncontrolled tourism which was causing social impacts on the resident population and environmental problems.
The park is administered by the Chico Mendes Institute for Biodiversity Conservation (ICMBio).

The consultative council was created by ordinance 75 of 25 June 2012.
A federal court decision published on 20 July 2012 discussed a project to build a local road from km 112 of highway BR-307 to the 5th special platoon of the Brazilian army frontier force based in an area near the Ariabu village of the Yanomami Indians in the Matucará region of São Gabriel da Cachoeira. 
The court concluded that the constitution did not allow such a project without prior study of the environmental impact and approval by the Federal Public Ministry, Brazilian Institute of Environment and Renewable Natural Resources (IBAMA) and FUNAI.
As of April 2015 there was no management plan.

Terrain

The park is in the Western Amazonian geological province and is on the northwestern boundary of the Guiana Craton.
Crystalline rock formations of the Guiana Plateau predominate, but there are also sedimentary rocks of the Roraima group.
The terrain covers parts of the Roraima sedimentary plateau, the Amazonas-Orinoco plateau and the Rio Branco-Rio Negro pediplane.

The park contains the two highest peaks in Brazil, the  Pico da Neblina ("Cloud Peak") and the  Pico 31 de Março.
The Yanomami call the peaks "Yaripo" and "Masiripiwei".

The park is drained by left tributaries of the black water Rio Negro, including the Demiti, Cauburis and Maraiuá rivers.

People

Much of the park is also part of an indigenous territory.  
The north and east of the park cover part of the Yanomami Indigenous Territory.
The Yanomami Indigenous Territory includes about 50% of the park.
The park overlaps with the Médio Rio Negro II Indigenous Territory in the south.
The west of the park contains 93.73% of the  Balaio Indigenous Territory, approved in 2009.
The northwest overlaps with the Cué-cué/Marabitanas Indigenous Territory.
There are 46 communities in the indigenous territories, including members of the Yanomami, Tucano, Tuyuca, Desano, Baniwa, Koripako, Carapanã, Baré, Tariana, Pira-tapuya, Yepamasã, Kobéwa and Warekena ethnic groups.

The overlap causes problems due to conflicting demands of park management and indigenous sovereignty.
Since the park is in a border area there is a military presence, which also causes problems.
The park suffers from conflicts associated with the presence of gold prospectors and extractors of lianas, which cause irreversible damage.
In some areas the prospectors cause mercury contamination.
There is also illegal mining, logging and extraction of forests products.

The Chico Mendes Institute for Biodiversity Conservation (ICMBio), Fundação Nacional do Índio (FUNAI: National Indian Foundation) and the Associação Yanomami do Rio Cauaburi e Afluentes (AYRCA) have been working together to reopen the park and organize tourist activity, particularly visits to the Pico da Neblina.
Researchers must obtain permission from ICMBio's Biodiversity Information and Authorization System.
If the research area includes indigenous land, they must also get approval from FUNAI.

Environment

The park is in the Guayanan Highlands moist forests ecoregion.
It has a great variety of vegetation formations with different endemic and rare plants.
The first botanists who visited the park consider that it is one of the places with the greatest biodiversity and endemism on the planet, but there has been a lack of detailed studies to confirm this.
Vegetation types include campinarana (3%), dense rainforest (35%) and contact between campinarana and rainforest (62%).
The vegetation formation include terra firme forests, igapós and small areas of campinarana.
There are also alpine meadows in the tabular plateaus.

Common trees in the dense forest areas include Caraioa taquari, Clusia cf. Columaris and Mauritia flexuosa.
The densest formations also include Micropholis guianensis, Licania membranacea, Swartzia viridifolia, Pouteria engleri, Qualea albiflora and Astrocaryum mumbaca.
Common trees in the open forest include Humiria balsamifera, Eperua purpurea and Hevea rigidifolia.
Other trees in the most open formations are E Orbygnia cf. Racemosa, Puteria guianensis and Carvocar glabrum.
The areas of campinarana contain caranã (Mauritia carana), tamaquaré (Caraipa grandiflora) and Pau-amarelo (Lissocarpa benthami).
Endemic flora include Schefflera plurispicata, Hortia neblinensis, Casearia neblinae, Gustavia acuminata and Heliamphora neblinae.

The park is home a rich variety of fauna, including several endangered species. 
The primate golden-backed uakari (Cacajao melanocephalus) is still abundant in the area, although its habitat has been reduced elsewhere, as is the Guianan cock-of-the-rock (Rupicola rupicola), a small orange bird that inhabits forested areas. 
Other species include the bush dog (Speothos venaticus), jaguar (Panthera onca), black hawk-eagle (Spizaetus tyrannus) and ornate hawk-eagle (Spizaetus ornatus), South American tapir (Tapirus terrestris), Titi monkey species, toco toucan (Ramphastos toco), black curassow (Crax alector) and grey-winged trumpeter (Psophia crepitans).
The endangered white-bellied spider monkey (Ateles belzebuth) is found in the park.
The park is also home to the Neblina uakari (Cacajao hosomi).

References

Sources

National parks of Brazil
Protected areas of Amazonas (Brazilian state)
Guayana Highlands
Rio Negro (Amazon)
Environment of Amazonas (Brazilian state)
Protected areas established in 1979
1979 establishments in Brazil